Logo is a commune in the Cercle of Kayes in the Kayes Region of south-western Mali. The main village (chef-lieu) is Sabouciré . In 2009 the commune had a population of 13,873.

References

External links

.

Communes of Kayes Region